The Congress Street Fire Station, now known as the Boston Fire Museum, is an historic fire station at 344 Congress Street in Boston, Massachusetts.

The Romanesque style station was designed by Harrison H. Atwood, then the city architect, and constructed in 1891.  It is distinctive for its early use, within this style, of light-colored brick, and features a rusticated ground level and progressively more refined detailing as it rises.

The building was added to the National Register of Historic Places in 1987, and was included in the Fort Point Channel Historic District in 2004. It now serves as the Boston Fire Museum.

See also
National Register of Historic Places listings in northern Boston, Massachusetts

References

External links
Boston Fire Museum - official website

Fire stations completed in 1891
Fire stations on the National Register of Historic Places in Massachusetts
Buildings and structures in Boston
Museums in Boston
Defunct fire stations in Massachusetts
Financial District, Boston
Firefighting museums in Massachusetts
1891 establishments in Massachusetts
National Register of Historic Places in Boston
Historic district contributing properties in Massachusetts